Reign of Fire is the 13th studio album from reggae and dancehall artist Capleton. The album was released on August 26, 2004. The album is said to have production from Bobby Dixon, Khabir Bonner, Ian Forrester, Stephen Gibbs, Ryon Kerr, Richard Fisher and Stephen Marley

Track listing

References

2004 albums
Capleton albums